Charles Pierce may refer to:

 Charles Wilson Pierce (1823–1907), U.S. Representative from Alabama
 Charlie W. Pierce (1864–1939), Florida pioneer and author
 Charles H. Pierce (1875–1944), Philippine–American War Medal of Honor recipient
 Charlie Pierce (footballer) (1917–2007), Australian rules footballer
 Charles Pierce (female impersonator) (1926–1999), American female impersonator
 Charles B. Pierce (1938–2010), American film director
 Charlie Pierce (Charles P. Pierce, born 1953), American sportswriter, political blogger, and author

See also
Charles Sanders Peirce (1839–1914), American logician, mathematician, scientist, philosopher, whose family name is often misspelled "Pierce"
Charles Pearce (disambiguation)
Charles Ormerod Cato Pearse (1884–1953), South African cricketer
Charles Pierce Davey (1925–2002), American boxer